Eric Stephens (1909–2001) was a British comic strip artist who contributed to Jack and Jill, drawing episodes of the cover strip 'Jack and Jill of Buttercup Farm' and colouring a number of centre-spread features such as 'There Was An Old Woman Who Lived in a Shoe' and 'Our Village'. Stephens also contributed episodes of 'Sonny and Sally' to Playhour and 'Paddington Park' to Bonnie.
Though trained as a lithographer, his talent as a draughtsman soon led him into advertising work. After serving in the RAF during the second world war, he became a stationery designer. It was at this time that Stephens became friends with the artist Hugh McNeill, who persuaded him to follow a career as a free-lance artist in children's comics.

British comics artists
1909 births
2001 deaths